Bruce MacLeish Dern (born June 4, 1936) is an American actor. He has received several accolades, including the Cannes Film Festival Award for Best Actor and the Silver Bear for Best Actor. He was nominated for the Academy Award for Best Supporting Actor for Coming Home (1978) and the Academy Award for Best Actor for Nebraska (2013). He is also a BAFTA Award, two-time Genie Award, and three-time Golden Globe Award nominee.

A member of The Actors Studio, he rose to prominence during the New Hollywood era, through roles in films such as They Shoot Horses, Don't They? (1969), The Incredible 2-Headed Transplant (1971), The Cowboys, Silent Running, and The King of Marvin Gardens (all 1972). Other notable films include The Great Gatsby (1974), Posse (1975), Family Plot (1976), Black Sunday (1977), The Driver (1978), Tattoo (1981), That Championship Season (1982), Monster (2003), The Hateful Eight (2015), The Artist's Wife (2019) and Once Upon a Time in Hollywood (2019). He played Frank Harlow in the HBO series Big Love (2006–2011).

Dern is the father of actress Laura Dern, with his ex-wife, actress Diane Ladd.

Early life
Dern was born in Chicago, the son of Jean (née MacLeish; 1908–1972) and John Dern (1903–1958), a utility chief and attorney. He grew up in Kenilworth, Illinois. His paternal grandfather, George Dern, was a Utah governor and Secretary of War (he was serving in the latter position during the time of Bruce's birth). Dern's maternal grandfather was a Vice President of the Carson, Pirie and Scott stores, which were established by his own father, Scottish-born businessman Andrew MacLeish. Dern's maternal granduncle was poet Archibald MacLeish. His godfather was governor and two-time presidential nominee Adlai Stevenson II. Dern attended New Trier High School and the University of Pennsylvania. A lifelong avid runner, he was a track star in high school and sought to qualify for the Olympic Trials in 1956.

Career

Dern studied at The Actors Studio, alongside Elia Kazan and Lee Strasberg. He starred with Lyle Kessler in the Philadelphia premiere of Samuel Beckett's Waiting for Godot. Dern starred with Paul Newman and Geraldine Page in the original Broadway run of Tennessee Williams' Sweet Bird of Youth. Dern began working on films and television series in the 1960s. After his film debut Wild River, he played the sailor in a few flashbacks in Marnie and a murdered lover in Hush...Hush, Sweet Charlotte. He played a murderous rustler in Hang 'Em High, a gunfighter in Support Your Local Sheriff!, and an impoverished farmer in the film adaptation of Horace McCoy's novel They Shoot Horses, Don't They?.

In Mark Rydell's western film The Cowboys, he played a cattle thief who kills a rancher (John Wayne). While filming, Wayne warned Dern: "America will hate you for this," and Dern replied, "Yeah, but they'll love me in Berkeley." Dern had a leading role in the ecological science-fiction film Silent Running and co-starred with Jack Nicholson in The King of Marvin Gardens. Dern played Tom Buchanan in the film adaptation of F. Scott Fitzgerald's novel The Great Gatsby (1974). In Kirk Douglas' Revisionist Western film Posse, Dern played a train-robber who uses his wiles to turn the tables on his captor, an ambitious, politically minded US marshal (Douglas). Dern starred in the beauty pageant satire film Smile, and in Alfred Hitchcock's final film Family Plot. Dern played a detective on the trail of a getaway driver (Ryan O'Neal) in the neo-noir film The Driver. In John Frankenheimer's thriller film Black Sunday, Dern played a vengeful Vietnam War veteran and Goodyear Blimp pilot who launches a massive terrorist attack at the Super Bowl. Dern played another Vietnam veteran and the disturbed husband of a perplexed woman (Jane Fonda) in Hal Ashby's war film Coming Home, and was nominated for an Academy Award for Best Supporting Actor.

In Bob Brooks's erotic thriller film Tattoo, Dern played an increasingly-deranged tattoo artist who imprisons a fashion model (Maud Adams). The film was dogged by controversy throughout its post-production and pre-release phase - the film's release was delayed by nearly a year - and for his lead performance, Dern earned a Worst Actor Razzie nomination. However, he bounced back by winning the Silver Bear for Best Actor at the 33rd Berlin International Film Festival for his performance in Jason Miller's That Championship Season (1982). Over the next few decades, Dern played a Vietnam veteran and neighborhood survivalist in Joe Dante's suburban satire The 'Burbs, a local crime boss in Michael Ritchie's Diggstown, a rival of Wild Bill Hickok in Walter Hill's Wild Bill, and George Spahn in Quentin Tarantino's Once Upon a Time in Hollywood. Dern's autobiography, Things I've Said, But Probably Shouldn't Have: An Unrepentant Memoir, was published in 2007.

In Alexander Payne's film Nebraska, Dern played an elderly resident believing he has won a million dollars, and undertakes a road trip from Billings, Montana to Lincoln, Nebraska to claim the prize. He won the Best Actor Award at the 2013 Cannes Film Festival and was nominated for the Academy Award for Best Actor.

In the course of his long and prolific career, Dern collaborated with film directors, including Walter Hill (The Driver, Wild Bill and Last Man Standing), Joe Dante (The 'Burbs, Small Soldiers and The Hole), and Quentin Tarantino (Django Unchained, The Hateful Eight and Once Upon a Time in Hollywood). In an interview for The A.V. Club, Dern said, "I always say that I feel like I’ve worked for six geniuses in my career... And the six directors, not in any order, would be Mr. Kazan, Mr. Hitchcock, Douglas Trumbull, Alexander Payne, Quentin Tarantino, and Francis Coppola." In an interview with Josh Olson and Joe Dante for the podcast series The Movies That Made Me, and while discussing his career, Dern cited the films of David Lean (specifically, Lawrence of Arabia, Great Expectations and The Bridge on the River Kwai), as among the films that inspired him.

When asked if he has ever contemplated retirement, Dern has stated, “If you think I’m gonna retire so Jimmy fucking Caan can get another part from me, you’re dead wrong. Because I’m gonna go till I’m 100. My goal is to do stuff with older characters that people never got the chance to do, because they never lived long enough... And because I don’t have anything else I can do."

Personal life
Dern was married to Marie Dawn Pierce from 1957 to 1959. He married Diane Ladd in 1960. Their first daughter, Diane Elizabeth Dern (born November 29, 1960), died at eighteen months from head injuries after falling into a swimming pool on May 18, 1962. The couple's second daughter, Laura, is also an actress. After his divorce from Ladd in 1969, Dern married Andrea Beckett. Dern, Ladd and Laura received adjoining stars on the Hollywood Walk of Fame on November 1, 2010.

Filmography

Film

Television

Video games

Awards and nominations

References

External links
 
 
 Bruce Dern at the University of Wisconsin's Actors Studio audio collection
 
 Cinema Retro's Evening with Bruce Dern at The Players, New York City

1936 births
Living people
20th-century American male actors
21st-century American male actors
American male film actors
American male television actors
American people of Dutch descent
American people of English descent
American people of German descent
American people of Scottish descent
Choate Rosemary Hall alumni
Male actors from Chicago
Male Western (genre) film actors
Cannes Film Festival Award for Best Actor winners
Silver Bear for Best Actor winners
University of Pennsylvania alumni
Western (genre) television actors
People from Kenilworth, Illinois
Dern family